The Lachish reliefs are a set of Assyrian palace reliefs narrating the story of the Assyrian victory over the kingdom of Judah during the siege of Lachish in 701 BCE. Carved between 700 and 681 BCE, as a decoration of the South-West Palace of Sennacherib in Nineveh (in modern Iraq), the relief is today in the British Museum in London, and was included as item 21 in the BBC Radio 4 series A History of the World in 100 Objects by the museum's former director Neil MacGregor. The Lion Hunt of Ashurbanipal sequence was found in the same palace.

Identification

The reliefs were discovered by the then 28-year-old Austen Henry Layard during excavations in 1845–1847. Commenting on the inscription above the seated figure of Sennacherib, Layard wrote:

Layard noted in his work that Henry Rawlinson, the "Father of Assyriology", disagreed with the identification as the biblical Lachish. Rawlinson had written in 1852: "At the same time, it is hardly possible that the capture of Lakitsu, which is figured in the most elaborate manner on the walls of Sennacherib's palace at Nineveh, can refer to this city, as the two names are written quite differently in the Cuneiform characters." Layard and others refuted Rawlinson's identification, and the identification as the biblical Lachish prevailed.

Israeli researcher Yigael Yadin showed that the images of the walls and town depicted fit with the uncovered walls and town as seen from a certain point near the Tel Lachish digs. The descriptions shown in the reliefs were compared with those written about Lachish in the bible and found to be similar as well.

Interpretation

The events surrounding the conquest of Lachish are recorded in an unparalleled number of sources for the 8th century BCE; in the Hebrew Bible, the Lachish reliefs, Assyrian cuneiform prisms and in the archeological excavations at Lachish. Sennacherib's conquests of Judean cities, without the capital Jerusalem, are mentioned in the Bible, the book of Kings, Book of Chronicles, and in the book of Isaiah.
 
"Later, when Sennacherib king of Assyria and all his forces were laying siege to Lachish, he sent his officers to Jerusalem with this message for Hezekiah king of Judah and for all the people of Judah who were there." – (II Chronicles 32:9)

"Now it came to pass in the fourteenth year of King Hezekiah that Sennacherib king of Assyria came up against all the fortified cities of Judah and took them." – (Isaiah 36:1–2)

In his annals, Sennacherib claimed that he destroyed 46 fortified cities and towns of Judah and took 200,150 captives, although the number of captives is seen today widely as exaggeration. He also claimed that he besieged King Hezekiah of the Judah in Jerusalem "like a bird in a cage." Grabbe and other scholars today consider the city pictured on the Lachish relief to be Jerusalem. They point out that since Jerusalem was not captured by the Assyrians, the artist from Nineveh who carved the relief "added simply Lakisu instead of "Ursalimmu" (Jerusalem). Other authors point out that the siege of Jerusalem is not depicted on the Lachish relief because it resulted in failure and the relief was seen as a way of compensation for not conquering Jerusalem. The size of the relief, its position in the central room of his palace, and the fact that the Lachish relief constitutes the only battle portrait created by Sennacherib, indicate the importance he gave to this battle and presumed victory over Judah.

References

Bibliography

7th-century BC inscriptions
1840s archaeological discoveries
Assyrian inscriptions
Middle Eastern objects in the British Museum
Hebrew Bible
Wars of ancient Israel
8th-century BC conflicts
Battles involving Assyria
Lachish
Assyrian art and architecture
Sennacherib
Reliefs